Orchid fleck dichorhavirus, commonly called Orchid fleck virus (OFV), is a non-enveloped, segmented, single-stranded (ss) RNA negative-strand virus, transmitted by the false spider mite, Brevipalpus californicus.
OFV causes necrotic and chlorotic lesions on the leaves of many genera in the family Orchidaceae.

Introduction
Orchid fleck virus, despite its presence worldwide, only affects a small spectrum of human life.  Orchids are not used for food but rather serve mainly as ornamental decoration.  Therefore, only about 2 to 3 scientific reports are written about OFV each year.  The whole genome of OFV has been sequenced and its six main protein products have been sequenced as well.

Much is still not known about OFV including how exactly and why vector mites travel from orchid to orchid, and more host species of flowers are being discovered annually.  The more information researchers discover, the more they realize there is still much left to learn.  Many orchid enthusiasts are participating in "citizen science" by posting their OFV-related findings on international horticulture blogs and forums.

Virion morphology

OFV was first described as bacilliform but depending on the method of preparation, OFV can appear bullet-shaped or bacilliform.  On average, OFV is 40 nm in diameter and between 100 and 150 nm long.  Each viral particles is organized into a tight 25 turn helix, with a pitch of about 4.5 nm.

Genomics
OFV contains two ssRNA molecules, RNA1 and RNA2, of 6413 and 6001 base pairs, respectively.  GenBank contains the whole sequenced genome of OFV.  RNA1 (GenBank AB244417) codes for five proteins whereas RNA2 (GenBank AB244418) only codes for one. Both strands possess open reading frames (ORF), which are read in the negative sense.

RNA1
 ORF1: Nucleocapsid (N) protein
 ORF2: Phosphoprotein (P)
 ORF3: Proteins involved in viral cell-to-cell movement
 ORF4: Matrix (M) protein
 ORF5: Glycoprotein (G)

RNA2
 ORF6: Polymerase (L) protein (RNA-dependent RNA polymerase)

Pathophysiology
Chlorotic and necrotic flecks, spots, and/or ringspots, as well as yellow flecks or spots are all symptoms of an OFV infection.  Studies have also shown that OFV may prevent the propagation of other viruses in an already OFV-infected plant.

Vector
The false spider mite, B. californicus serves as the major vector for OFV.
Brevipalpus mites go through four distinct, active life stages, each separated by nonmotile chrysalis stages.  The protonymph, deutonymph, and adult stages can infect their host plants with OFV, whereas the larval stage is not infectious.  Even after three weeks of incubation of an OFV-positive mite on an OFV-resistant plant, B. californicus proved to still be infectious, showing that OFV is persistent.

Hosts

OFV is able to naturally infect around 50 different species in 31 genera, all belonging to the family Orchidaceae.  25 other species from 11 non-orchid families have been infected through sap transmission or artificial viral inoculation.

Life cycle

Studies have not shown whether or not OFV actually replicates within B. californicus  but electron microscopy has revealed an intricate viral life cycle within the host cells.

Viral ssRNA is replicated and transcribed into mRNA in the host cell's nucleus.  Viral mRNA is then exported out of the nucleus into the cytoplasm where it is translated into viral protein by the host's ribosomes.  The viral proteins then reenter the nucleus where they aggregate into a viroplasm.  There, the various viral structural proteins assemble with both strands of ssRNA to form complete OFV particles.  These particles often cluster in between the inner and outer nuclear membranes, causing visible projections which often evaginate into cytoplasmic vesicles.  Electron microscopy has revealed clusters of viral particles positioned perpendicular to the inner nuclear membrane, the endoplasmic reticulum, as well as the aforementioned cytoplasmic vesicles, forming distinctive “spoked wheel”
structures.

Effects on fitness
Infected orchids don't bloom as well as healthy ones, affecting efficacy of pollination and fertilization.  Also, the orchids that do bloom look lifeless making them less attractive on the cut flower market.

Epidemiology
Cases of orchid fleck virus or OF-like viruses have been reported in Australia, Brazil, China, Columbia, Costa Rica, Denmark, Germany, Japan, Korea, South Africa, and the United States, i.e. every continent except for Antarctica.

Due to the fact that viruses depend on their host cell for replication, OFV cannot be cultured independently.  However, two non-orchid indicator hosts (plants used in research that show characteristic symptoms of specific viral infections) C. quinoa and T. expansa are commonly used for viral inoculation and isolation.

There are no known pathogens of OFV itself but its vector, B. californicus has a symbiotic relationship with bacteria of the genus Cardinium.  The symbiont is the cause of the mites' thelytokous method of reproduction (where females are produced from unfertilized eggs) and the explanation for the absence of male B. californicus mites.

Diagnosis
Thin tissue samples from plants with visible symptoms of OFV can undergo:
 Electron microscopy to visualize virions and complete viral particles
 Serological analysis to identify and isolate specific viral proteins
 Reverse Transcription-Polymerase Chain Reaction to identify viral RNA

Prevention
Methods for preventing the spread of OFV among separate plants:
 Ensure seedlings are virus-free
 Improve quarantine measures
 Eliminate sources of infection (mites or other infected plants)
 Ensure proper environment for cultivation
 Work towards developing OFV-resistant plants through genetic engineering

Treatment
Once a plant is infected with OFV, it is unclear whether pruning visibly infected tissue will cure the plant of the virus.  It is also unclear whether infected plants produce seeds containing viral particles.

History
The earliest recorded work concerning Orchid Fleck Virus was published in Japan in 1969.  OFV was reported as concentrations of short, rod-like particles in chlorotic lesions on the leaves of boat orchids of the genus Cymbidium.

Human relevance
Orchids and other tropical flowers are extremely important to the agricultural economy of many Southeast Asian countries. The Vanda 'Miss Joaquim' orchid hybrid is Singapore's national flower. According to the Orchid Society, the world market for orchids is worth more than $1 billion with Japan and the United States leading the way in 2010. In the US in 2005 produced around $144 million worth of orchids.

References 

Orchid diseases
Mononegavirales
Rhabdoviridae